Operation Diablo Express was a cross-border raid launched on 29 January 2016, by a combined force of Mexican and American police to apprehend members of the Sinaloa Cartel in Lukeville, Arizona, and the neighboring border town Sonoyta, in northwestern Sonora.

According to Immigration and Customs Enforcement (ICE) spokeswoman Gillian M. Christensen; the Sinaloa cartel "cell" targeted in Sonoyta and the adjacent Lukeville area were responsible for the "importation of millions of pounds of illegal drugs, including marijuana, heroin, cocaine and methamphetamine" into the United States, as well as the smuggling of "millions of dollars in U.S. currency, along with weapons, into Mexico." Christensen also reported that an ICE unit, Homeland Security Investigations, assisted Mexican police in the operation. The DEA, FBI, Customs and Border Protection and Arizona state and local agencies were also involved in coordinated operations on the Arizona side of the border.

Mexico's National Security commissioner, Renato Sales, issued a statement explaining that the operation was conducted via land and air and that when Federal Police moved in they came under fire from armed men, who were guarding the area. Two of the gunmen were killed in the ensuing gun battle and twenty-two others were taken into police custody.

See also
 Joaquín Guzmán
 Operation Sinaloa

References

Battles of the Mexican drug war
2016 in Mexico
2016 in the United States
2016 in Arizona
Conflicts in 2016
Operations against organized crime in Mexico
Operations against organized crime in the United States
January 2016 events in North America
January 2016 events in the United States
Sinaloa Cartel